The 2020–21 College of Charleston Cougars men's basketball team represented the College of Charleston in the 2020–21 NCAA Division I men's basketball season. The Cougars, led by seventh-year head coach Earl Grant, play their home games at the TD Arena in Charleston, South Carolina as members of the Colonial Athletic Association. In a season limited due to the ongoing COVID-19 pandemic, the Cougars finished the season 9–10, 6–4 CAA play to finish in third place. They lost in the quarterfinals of the CAA tournament to Drexel.

Previous season
The Cougars finished the 2019–20 season 17–14, 11–7 in CAA play to finish in a tie for fourth place. They lost in the quarterfinals of the CAA tournament to Delaware.

Offseason

Departures

Incoming transfers

2020 recruiting class

Roster

Schedule and results 

|-
!colspan=12 style=| Regular season

|-
!colspan=12 style=| CAA tournament
|-

|-

Source

References

College of Charleston Cougars men's basketball seasons
College of Charleston Cougars
College of Charleston Cougars men's basketball
College of Charleston Cougars men's basketball